Joel Fridolf Naaralainen (13 December 1867 - 30 December 1915) was a Finnish farmer and politician. He was a member of the Parliament of Finland from 1907 to 1908, representing the Social Democratic Party of Finland (SDP). He was born in Kuhmoinen.

References

1867 births
1915 deaths
People from Kuhmoinen
People from Häme Province (Grand Duchy of Finland)
Social Democratic Party of Finland politicians
Members of the Parliament of Finland (1907–08)